Menkheperre Necho I (Egyptian: Nekau, Greek: Νεχώς Α' or Νεχώ Α', Akkadian: Nikuu or Nikû) (? –  near Memphis) was a ruler of the ancient Egyptian city of Sais. He was the first securely attested local Saite king of the 26th Dynasty of Egypt who reigned for 8 years (672–) according to Manetho's Aegyptiaca. Egypt was reunified by his son Psamtik I.

Biography
In  Necho became ruler of Sais, assuming the pharaonic titulary, and a year later the Assyrians led by Esarhaddon invaded Egypt. Necho became one of Esarhaddon's vassals, and the latter confirmed Necho's office and his possessions, as well as giving him new territories, possibly including the city of Memphis.

In , King Taharqa of the 25th Dynasty was advancing from the south toward the Nile Delta principalities which were formally under Assyrian control; Esarhaddon prepared himself to return to Egypt to repel the invader, but died suddenly. Esarhaddon's death led to a political crisis in the Neo-Assyrian Empire but at the end his son Ashurbanipal managed to become the new undisputed monarch. The counter-offensive planned by his father took place in 667–.

Taharqa was defeated and driven back to Thebes, but Ashurbanipal found that the fleeing king and some of the rulers of Lower Egypt – named Pekrur of Pishaptu (Per-Sopdu), Sharruludari of Ṣinu (maybe Pelusium) and Nikuu (Necho I) – were plotting against him. The Assyrian king captured the conspirators, killed part of the population of the cities they governed, and deported the prisoners to Nineveh.

Unexpectedly, Necho was pardoned by the Assyrian king, and was reinstated at Sais with his previous possessions as well as many new territories as a gift, while his son Psamtik (called Nabusezibanni in Akkadian) was made mayor of Athribis. It has been suggested that with his magnanimity Ashurbanipal hoped to rely on the loyalty of an Egyptian ally in the event of another offensive led by the 25th Dynasty pharaohs, and perhaps to inspire and strengthen a rivalry between the two families (i.e., Kushites and Saites) because of shared interests. According to historical records, Necho I was slain in  near Memphis while defending his realms from a new Kushite offensive led by Taharqa's successor Tantamani while Psamtik fled to Nineveh under Ashurbanipal's aegis. This Nubian invasion into the Egyptian Delta was subsequently (664–) repelled by the Assyrians who proceeded to advance south into Upper Egypt and performed the infamous sack of Thebes.

With the Nile Delta secured once again, Psamtik I was appointed with his dead father's offices and territories. Later, he ultimately was successful in reuniting Egypt under his sole control.

Family

Danish Egyptologist Kim Ryholt made claims regarding Necho I: studying a papyrus from Tebtunis, he stated that Necho I was the son of a king named Tefnakht, presumably Tefnakht II. Ryholt also put in discussion the existence of Nekauba who was the purported predecessor of Necho I and possibly his brother; Ryholt suggested that the few, dubious documents regarding Nekauba should be attributed to the later Necho II instead, and that Necho I was the direct successor of Tefnakht II.

French historian Christian Settipani believes that Necho married Istemabet, and they were the parents of Psamtik I.

According to British Egyptologist Kenneth Kitchen, it is possible that princess Ta-khered-en-ta-ihet-[weret] was Necho's daughter, given in a politically arranged marriage to the local ruler of Herakleopolis, Pediese.

A now-lost limestone lintel from Luxor depicted a chantress of Amun named Meresamun along with a Saite form of Osiris and the Divine Adoratrice of Amun Shepenupet II; Meresamun is called "royal daughter of the lord of the Two lands, Nec[...]", the latter name written within a royal cartouche. It appears likely that Meresamun's royal father was no other than Necho I who sent his daughter to the Precinct of Amun-Re in Karnak, thus marking the beginning of the Saite influence in the city of Thebes.

Attestations

Necho I is primarily known from Assyrian documents but a few Egyptian objects are known too. A glazed pottery statuette of Horus which contains his cartouches and a dedication to the goddess Neith of Sais is now exhibited at the Petrie Museum of Egyptian Archaeology (UC 14869). The aforementioned, long–lost lintel of Meresamun was once photographed in an antiquities market at Luxor. A bronze kneeling statuette of a king Necho is housed at the Brooklyn Museum (acc.no. 71.11), but it is impossible to determine if it actually depicts Necho I or rather Necho II instead. He is also mentioned in several demotic stories.
Necho I's Year 2 is attested on a privately held donation stela that was first published by Olivier Perdu. The stela records a large land donation to the Osirian triad (Osiris, Isis, and Horus) of Per-Hebyt (modern Behbeit el-Hagar near Sebennytos) by the "priest of Isis Mistress of Hebyt, Great Chief... son of Iuput, Akanosh."

References

Bibliography

External links

664 BC deaths
7th-century BC Pharaohs
Pharaohs of the Twenty-sixth Dynasty of Egypt
Year of birth unknown
Monarchs killed in action